The Atomichron was the world's first commercial atomic clock, built by the National Company, Inc. of Malden, Massachusetts. It was also the first self-contained portable atomic clock and was a caesium standard clock. More than 50 clocks with the trademarked Atomichron name were produced.

See also
 Chip-scale atomic clock
 Hoptroff London

References

External links 
* A Brief History of the National Company, Inc
 Atomichron: The Atomic Clock from Concept to Commercial Product

Atomic clocks